Pierre-Joseph de Castellan  was a French Navy officer. He served in the War of American Independence.

Biography 
Castellan joined the Navy on 10 April 1748 as a Garde-Marine. He was promoted to Lieutenant on 15 January 1762, and to Captain on 13 May 1779.

He commanded the 80-gun Auguste at the Battle of the Chesapeake on 5 September 1781, and at the Battle of the Saintes on 12 April 1782, as flag captain to Bougainville. 

On 25 March 1785, he retired with the rank of Brigadier.

Sources and references 
 Notes

Citations

References
 
 

French Navy officers
French military personnel of the American Revolutionary War